Ain Khaled is a district in the municipality of Al Rayyan in Qatar. Found on the outskirts of the capital city Doha, the area is historically known for its well which served the people of Doha and neighboring villages.

Etymology
The first word in the district's name, "Ain", is an Arabic word reserved for natural underground water sources. Formerly, the district was known as "Ain Al Seneem", with "Al Seneem" being the name of a local well. However, the district's name was later changed to "Ain Khaled", in honor of a respected local who went by that name.

Landmarks
Fereej Ain Khaled Stadium, managed by the Qatar Olympic Committee, is located on Khaled bin Ahmed Street.
Ain Khaled Family Park is located on Bu Ethnaiteen Street.
Ain Khaled Gate Compound is located on Khaled bin Ahmed Street.
The Ain Khaled Roundabout is a local landmark. With a total area of 1,200 m2, the centerpiece of the roundabout is a traditional-style well with a pump powered by solar cells. Roughly half of the area of the roundabout is grassed while the other half is filled with decorative pebbles.

Development
In 2009, Barwa Group launched a project to develop an 11 km-long commercial avenue in Ain Khaled.

Transport
Currently, the elevated Ain Khaled Metro Station is under construction, having been launched during Phase 2C. Once completed, it will be part of Doha Metro's Gold Line.

Education
The following schools are located in Ain Khaled:

References

Populated places in Al Rayyan